Gustavo Vargas López (born January 24, 1955, in La Piedad, Michoacán) is a Mexican former football manager and player.

External links
Liga MX 

1955 births
Living people
Mexican football managers
Mexican footballers
Footballers from Michoacán
People from La Piedad
Association football defenders